The Beat may refer to:

Film and television 
 The Beat (1988 film), an American drama starring William McNamara
 The Beat (2003 film), an American drama starring Jazsmin Lewis
 The Beat (TV series), a 2000s American drama series
 The Beat (Philippine TV program), a current affairs and talk program
 The !!!! Beat, a 1966 American music series.
 The Beat with Ari Melber, a news and politics show on MSNBC

Music 
 The Beat (British band), a British ska band, known in the United States as the English Beat and in Australia as the British Beat
 The Beat (American band), a power-pop band, later known as Paul Collins Beat
The Beat (American band album), their debut album
The Beat (Boney James album), 2013 album by Boney James
 "The Beat", a song by Basshunter from his LOL <(^^,)> album
 "The Beat", a song by Elvis Costello from the album This Year's Model
 "The Beat", a song by Ima Robot from the album Monument to the Masses
 The Beat: Go-Go's Fusion of Funk and Hip-Hop, a 2001 compilation album

Radio 
 The Beat (Sirius), on Sirius Satellite Radio
 CFBT-FM, "The Beat 94.5", in Vancouver, British Columbia, Canada
 CKBT-FM, "91.5 The Beat", in Kitchener, Ontario, Canada
 KKBT, "100.3 The Beat", in Los Angeles, California, U.S.
 KZCE, "101.1 The Beat", in Phoenix, Arizona, U.S.
 WMIB, "103.5 The Beat", in Miami and Fort Lauderdale, Florida, U.S.
 WBTJ, "106.5 The Beat", in Richmond, Virginia, U.S.
 The Beat 99.9 FM, in Lagos, Nigeria

Other media 
 The Beat (magazine), a free crime-prevention magazine in London
 The Beat 102.7, a fictional radio station in the video game Grand Theft Auto IV
 Comics Beat, a comics magazine

See also 
 Beat (disambiguation)